Human accelerated regions (HARs), first described in August 2006, are a set of 49 segments of the human genome that are conserved throughout vertebrate evolution but are strikingly different in humans. They are named according to their degree of difference between humans and chimpanzees (HAR1 showing the largest degree of human-chimpanzee differences). Found by scanning through genomic databases of multiple species, some of these highly mutated areas may contribute to human-specific traits. Others may represent loss of functional mutations, possibly due to the action of biased gene conversion rather than adaptive evolution.

Several of the HARs encompass genes known to produce proteins important in neurodevelopment. HAR1 is a 106-base pair stretch found on the long arm of chromosome 20 overlapping with part of the RNA genes HAR1F and HAR1R. HAR1F is active in the developing human brain. The HAR1 sequence is found (and conserved) in chickens and chimpanzees but is not present in fish or frogs that have been studied. There are 18 base pair mutations different between humans and chimpanzees, far more than expected by its history of conservation.

HAR2 includes HACNS1 a gene enhancer "that may have contributed to the evolution of the uniquely opposable human thumb, and possibly also modifications in the ankle or foot that allow humans to walk on two legs". Evidence to date shows that of the 110,000 gene enhancer sequences identified in the human genome, HACNS1 has undergone the most change during the evolution of humans following the split with the ancestors of chimpanzees. The substitutions in HAR2 may have resulted in loss of binding sites for a repressor, possibly due to biased gene conversion.

HAR-associated genes
HAR01: HAR1F & HAR1R
HAR02: CENTG2 including HACNS1
HAR03: MAD1L1
HAR04:
HAR05: WNK1
HAR06: WWOX
HAR07:
HAR08: POU6F2
HAR09: PTPRT
HAR10: FHIT
HAR11: DMD
HAR12: EBF
HAR20: PPARGC1A
HAR21: NPAS3 - association with psychiatric disorders
HAR23: MGC27016
HAR24: SCAP2
HAR28: LPHN4
HAR31: AUTS2
HAR33: TBC1D22A
HAR38: ITPR1
HAR40: ZBTB16
HAR43: AGBL4
HAR44: FHIT
HAR45: POLA
HAR47: KLHL14

See also
 Ultra-conserved element

References

Molecular genetics
Human genetics
Human evolution